Cinesexuality is a concept in film philosophy by feminist film theorist Patricia MacCormack which attempts to explain why people sometimes feel an intense attraction towards film.

Origins
MacCormack coined the term and used it as the title of her 2008 essay to describe her philosophical speculation about film, which is similar in some respects to the poststructuralist philosophy of desire by contemporary philosophers Gilles Deleuze and Félix Guattari.

Meaning
While the term is somewhat vague, she uses it to describe why there is a "desire which flows through all who want cinema as a lover," why film can feel erotic, whether such intense feelings may be explained by a psychic model of "tension and release," and why there is this "physical pleasure of cinema" which sometimes manifests itself in an "erotic and subversive" way.

Analysis
Catherine Grant suggested that MacCormack has essentially reformulated the term cinephilia, a term in film criticism which denotes passionate interest in film.

Two reviewers suggest that MacCormack explores the "inherent queerness of film," in the sense that the relation between spectators and a film is "inherently queer." According to reviewer Jill Crammond Wickham in Poets Quarterly, cinesexuality can explain not only why film audiences feel such a strong desire for what they see on screen, but why "our culture is so obsessed with movie stars."

Examples of cinesexuality
Hellraiser II (1988)
Alien (1979)
 The films of Mario Bava
Flesh for Frankenstein (1974)
Suspiria (1977)
Dimensions of Dialogue (1982)
 Bollywood cinema

See also
Sex in film
Feminist film theory
2008 in film

References

Further reading
 Patricia MacCormack, "A Cinema of Desire: Cinesexuality and Guattari’s Asignifying Cinema" in Women: A Cultural Review, 16 (3), Winter 2005/6

Film theory
Feminism and the arts
2000s neologisms